Puerto Rico Highway 301 (PR-301) is a main highway in Cabo Rojo, Puerto Rico. It begins in PR-101, close to PR-100 (PR-100 makes a final intersection with PR-101 before ending in PR-301), and goes south all the way to Los Morrillos Light, where it ends. It is the main access to the lighthouse, the Cabo Rojo cliffs, and Playa Sucia.

PR-301 is one of the few roads in Puerto Rico that are not entirely asphalted; the final kilometers are only sand. That same segment is surrounded by a desalinization plant.

Major intersections

Related route

See also

 List of highways numbered 301

References

External links

 PR-301, Cabo Rojo, Puerto Rico

301
Cabo Rojo, Puerto Rico